Johan Els (born 29 May 1979) is a South African strongman competitor from Christiana, South Africa. He is a 2 x times Africa's Strongest Man Champion (2016 and 2018) and was selected to the World's Strongest Man competition thrice, winning 6th place in the 2018 World's Strongest Man competition held in Manila, Philippines. Coached by Strength Coach Ricardo Barreto Johan Els Testimonial to Ricardo Barreto

Personal Records
Deadlift -  (2017 Arnold Africa)
Car Deadlift -  x 5 reps (2018 WSM Finals)
Deadlift Ladder -  5 lifts under 60 seconds (2018 WSM - Group 2)
Log press -  (2017 WSM - Group 3)
Viking press -  (2016 WSM - Group 5)
Circus Dumbbell press -  (2018 WSM - Group 2)
Super Yoke -  for 5.57 meters (2018 Arnold Africa)
Elephant frame carry -  for 44.93 meters (2017 WSM - Group 3)
Keg toss -  over 6.75 meters (2016 WSM - Group 5)
Loading race - 105 kg Anchor, 125 kg Anvil, 120 kg Keg, 150 kg Sandbag & 120 kg Safe (10m) - 34.12 seconds (2018 WSM Finals)
Medley - 2 x 150 kg sacks and 150 kg per each hand farmer's walk for 12 meters in 33.96 seconds (2018 WSM - Group 2)
Atlas Stones -  5 stones in 32.16 seconds (2018 WSM - Group 2)
Atlas Stone over bar -  x 4 reps, over a 4' bar (2018 Arnold Africa)
Arm Over Arm Pull -  for 17.57 meters (2018 WSM - Group 2)
Bus pull -  25 meters in 40.25 seconds (2018 WSM Finals)
Reference: Strongmanarchives.com

References

 
1979 births
Living people
South African strength athletes